Alison Smith is a New Zealand Paralympian who competed in sport shooting. At the 1984 Summer Paralympics, she won a bronze medal in the Air Rifle Integrated event.

References

External links 
 
 

Living people
Year of birth missing (living people)
New Zealand female sport shooters
Paralympic shooters of New Zealand
Medalists at the 1984 Summer Paralympics
Paralympic bronze medalists for New Zealand